The 1998 Winter Olympic Games cross-country skiing competition results were as follows.

Medal summary

Medal table

Men's events

Women's events

Participating NOCs
Thirty-six nations competed in the cross-country skiing events at Nagano.

References

External links
Official Olympic Report

 
1998 Winter Olympics
1998 Winter Olympics events
Olympics
Cross-country skiing competitions in Japan